The Ministry of Land Management, Cooperatives and Poverty Alleviation is a governmental ministry of Nepal responsible for land administration and management activities which ensures efficient and effective administration and sustainable management of available land resources throughout the country. The ministry, then called Ministry of Land Reform and Management, was merged with the Ministry of Co-operatives and Poverty Alleviation to form the Ministry of Agriculture, Land Management and Cooperatives in February 2018, but was reopened and renamed as a separate ministry in August 2018 as the Ministry of Land Management, Cooperatives and Poverty Alleviation.

History
The ministry was established in 1964 with three directorates (land reform, cooperatives and cadastral survey). One year later, three further directorates were added to its portfolio (agriculture, food and land management). In 1970, the  Ministry split into the Ministry of Food and Agriculture and the Ministry of Panchayat, Home and Land Reform. The ministry received its last portfolio of Land Reform and Management in 1986. Gopal Dahit of Nepal Loktantrik Forum under the Deuba Cabinet served as the last Minister of Land Reform and Management until the ministry was dissolved in 2018 and merged into the Ministry of Agriculture, Land Management and Cooperatives following the second Oli cabinet's decision to reduce the number of ministries in Nepal. Due to a cabinet expansion, the Ministry of Land Management, Cooperatives and Poverty Alleviation was reopened while the agriculture-related portfolio was changed to Ministry of Agricultural and Livestock Development.

Organisational structure
Four departments served under the ministry to facilitate and implement its work:
Department of Land Information And Archive
Department of Land Reform and Management
Survey Department
Land Management Training Centre (in Dhulikhel, Kavre)

Former Ministers of Land Reform and Management
This is a list of all Ministers of Land Reform and Management after the Nepalese Constituent Assembly election in 2013:

References

Land Reform and Management
1964 establishments in Nepal
Poverty in Nepal